Katalin Partics (born October 22, 1976) is a Greek modern pentathlete. She competed in the women's individual modern pentathlon events at the 2000 Summer Olympics, in which she placed 22nd, and the 2004 Summer Olympics, in which she placed 16th.

References

1976 births
Living people
Greek female modern pentathletes
Olympic modern pentathletes of Greece
Modern pentathletes at the 2000 Summer Olympics
Modern pentathletes at the 2004 Summer Olympics
Sportspeople from Budapest